Amiyawar is a village situated on the bank of the Son River in Rohtas district, Bihar, India. It is located close to the Nasriganj Police Station

Agriculture 
Amiyawar region plays a very important role in farming. Its primary crops are rice, wheat and vegetables. It

Climate
Winter temperatures typically range between 8 and 22 degrees Celsius. Summer temperatures are generally between 22 and 39 degrees Celsius.

Connectivity and others 
Amiyawar is connected to the transport system via state highway 15. In the village, there is a post office, a bank, a government school, a mosque, a rice mill, and several brick factories.

Geography 
Amiyawar is located between Khutaha and Nasriganj.

Villages in Rohtas district